This is a list of known World War II era codenames for military operations and missions commonly associated with World War II.  this is not a comprehensive list, but most major operations that Axis and Allied combatants engaged in are included, and also operations that involved neutral nation states. Operations are categorised according to the theater of operations, and an attempt has been made to cover all aspects of significant events. Operations contained in the Western Front category have been listed by year. Operations that follow the cessation of hostilities and those that occurred in the pre-war period are also included. Operations are listed alphabetically, and where multiple aspects are involved these are listed inline.

Flags used are those of the time period.

Africa
Excludes North African campaigns
 Chronometer (1941)   – Anglo-Indian capture of Assab
 Composition (1941)  – FAA attack on Massawa
 Ironclad (1942)   – Allied landings on Madagascar
Streamline Jane (1942)   – ground campaign on Madagascar
 Menace (1940)   – seaborne Free French and British attack on Dakar, French West Africa (Senegal)
 Postmaster (1942)  – SOE operation to capture three Axis vessels in the neutral Spanish island of Fernando Po
 Supply (1941)  –  Allied anti-submarine naval patrol off Madagascar

Atlantic Ocean
Includes North Sea and Arctic Ocean operations and actions against naval vessels in harbour
 Alacrity (1943)  – Allied naval patrols around Azores
 Berlin (1941)  – Atlantic cruise of Scharnhorst and Gneisenau
 Catechism (1944)  – final RAF air attack on Tirpitz
 Cerberus (1942)  – escape of German capital ships from Brest to home ports in Germany (Channel Dash)
 Croquet (1944)  – Allied anti-shipping off Norway
 Cupola (1945)  – British anti-shipping operation off Norway
 Deadlight (1945)  – postwar scuttling of U-boats
 Dervish (1941)  – first of the Arctic Convoys to the Soviet Union
 Domino (1943)  – second aborted Arctic sortie by Scharnhorst, Prinz Eugen and destroyers
 Doppelschlag ("Double blow") (1942)  – German anti-shipping operation off Novaya Zemlya by Admiral Scheer and Admiral Hipper
 Drachenhohle (1944)  – aborted attack on Home Fleet at Scapa Flow, using Mistel composite aircraft
 Drumbeat (1942)  – part of "Second Happy Time" (Paukenschlag)
 EJ (1941)  – British anti-shipping operation off Norway
 Enclose (1943)  – British anti-submarine air offensive in Bay of Biscay (also Enclose II)
 Foxchase (1945)  – British anti-shipping operation off Norway
 Fronttheater (1943)  – first aborted Arctic sortie by Scharnhorst, Prinz Eugen and destroyers
 Goodwood I, II, III and IV (1944)  – sequence of 4 carrier-borne air attacks on Tirpitz
 Holder (1943)  – British special naval transport to Murmansk
 Husar (1943)  – cancelled German anti-shipping operation in Kara Sea by Lutzow
 Leader (1943)   – antishipping operation off Norway by USS Ranger
 Lucid (1940)  – attempt to destroy German invasion barges
 Mascot (1944)  – failed carrier-borne air attack on Tirpitz
 Nordseetour ("North Sea Tour") (1940)  – first Atlantic operation of Admiral Hipper
 Obviate (1944)  – RAF air attack on Tirpitz
 Ostfront (1943)  – final operation of Scharnhorst to intercept convoy JW 55B
 Paderborn (1943)  – third and successful transfer of Scharnhorst and destroyers to Norway
 Paravane (1944)  – RAF air attack on Tirpitz
 Paukenschlag  ("Drumbeat", "Beat of the Kettle Drum", "Second happy time") (1942) – German U-boat campaign against shipping off the United States east coast
 Planet, Brawn and Tiger Claw (1944)  – cancelled carrier-borne air attacks on the Tirpitz
 Posthorn (1944)  – British naval air attack on shipping off Norway
 Potluck (1944)  – Allied anti-shipping patrol off Norway
 Primrose (1941)  – capture of 's Enigma cypher machine and documents by HMS Bulldog
 Regenbogen ("Rainbow") (1942)  Germany – failed German attack on Arctic convoy JW 51B, by Admiral Hipper and Lutzow
 Rheinübung ("Exercise Rhine") (1941)  Germany – planned German attacks on Allied shipping conducted by Bismarck and Prinz Eugen
 Rösselsprung ("Knights Move") (1942)  – German naval operation (including Tirpitz) to attack Arctic convoy PQ 17
 Roundel (1945)  – British convoy escort to Murmansk
 Source (1943)  – British X class submarine (midget submarine) attacks on German warships based in Norway
 Sportpalast (1942)  – aborted German naval operation (including Tirpitz) to attack Arctic convoys PQ-12 and QP-8
 Zauberflöte ("Magic Flute") (1942)  – return of damaged Prinz Eugen from Trondheim to Germany
 Stonewall (1943)       – Allied operation to intercept blockade runners in the Bay of Biscay
 Teardrop (1945)  – anti U-boat operation
 Tungsten (1944)  – carrier-borne air attack on Tirpitz
 Tunnel (1943)  – standard British plan to intercept German blockade runners
 Wikinger (1940)  – foray by German destroyers into the North Sea
 Wunderland (1942)  – German anti-shipping operation in Kara Sea by Admiral Scheer
 Zarin (1942)  – German mining action off Novaya Zemlya by Admiral Hipper and destroyers

Eastern Front

Mediterranean Sea

South West Pacific and Pacific Ocean

China
 Alpha (1944)   – improvement of the defences of Kunming against Japanese threats
 Ichigo (1944)  – Japanese campaign in eastern China to secure overland routes to Indo-China and airfields
 TO (1942)  – plan to capture US airfields at Hengyang, Lingling, Lweilin and Liuchow
 Matterhorn (1944)  – establishment of bases for US B-29 bomber aircraft
 Sankō (1942–1944)  – Japanese campaign in five provinces  of northeastern China to crush the Chinese resistance following the Hundred Regiments Offensive

South West, South, and South East Asia
Includes operations in Iraq, Syria, Iran, India, Burma, Malaya and Indo-China, and the Indian Ocean
 Anakim (1943)    – proposed strategy to retake Burma and reopen the land route to China
 Bajadere (1942)   – German special forces operation in India, including Free India Legion personnel
 Balsam (1945)  – photographic reconnaissance of southern Malaya and airstrikes against Sumatran airfields
 BAN (1943)  – defensive scheme for Mandalay and Meiktila
 Birdseed (1944)  – anti-shipping raid against Ramree harbour area
 Boarding Party (1943)  – raid against German ships interned in neutral port of Goa.
 Boomerang (1944)  air raid on Palembang
 C (1942)  – major Japanese naval incursion into Indian Ocean
 Canned (1944)  – search and destroy operation for German supply tanker
 Capital (1943)  – Allied capture of northern Burma
 Cockpit (1944)       – Allied naval airstrike on Sabang, Sumatra
 Operation Musketeer I, II, III (1944-1945)   – American and Filipino campaign to defeat and expel the Imperial Japanese forces occupying the Philippines.
 Collie (1945)  –  naval airstrikes against the Nicobar Islands and air cover for minesweeping forces near Phuket Island
 Corkscrew (1944)  – anti-shipping raid against Gwa area
 Countenance (1941)    – Allied invasion of neutral Iran
 Dover (1941)   – occupation of Abadan
 Crackler (1941)   —
 Marmalade (1941)   —
 Mopup (1941)   —
 Rapier (1941)   —
 Bishop (1941)   – mopping up of Abadan Island
 Crimson (1944)      – Allied naval airstrike and bombardment of Sabang, Sumatra
 Culverin (1943)  – proposed allied invasion of northern Sumatra
 Curtain (1944)  – naval bombardment of coast near Indin
 Dracula (1945)  – British amphibious assault on Rangoon, Burma.
 Bishop (1945)  – covering operation for Dracula
 Diplomat (1944)      – Allied exercise in preparation for joint operations against the Japanese
 Dukedom (1945)  – British search and destroy operation for Japanese cruiser Haguro
 Exporter (1941)     – British and Commonwealth invasion of Vichy French-held Syria
 Foil (1945)  – cutting of submarine telephone cables off Hong Kong
 Franz (1942)  – proposal to establish sabotage teams in Iran
 Ha-Go (1944)  – Japanese action to isolate and destroy Anglo-Indian forces in Burma
 Jaywick (1943)   – Anglo-Australian attack on Japanese shipping in Singapore harbour
 Krohcol (1942)  – British move into Thailand to pre-empt expected Japanese action
 Lentil (1945)  – naval air attack on refineries on Sumatra
 Livery (1945)  – naval air strikes on northern Malaya and air cover for minesweeping operations
 Longcloth (1943)  – Chindits advance into Burma
 Matador (1941)  – Planned British pre-emptive move into Siam from Malaya
 Matador (1945)  – British occupation of Ramree Island
 Meridian (1945)  – naval air attacks on installations on Sumatra
 Pamphlet (1943)  – convoying of Australian troops from Suez to Australia
 Pike (1940)   – planned air attack on Soviet oil installations at Baku
 Pioneer (1944)  – aborted anti-shipping raid against Kyaukpyu harbour
 Rathunt (1944)  – naval patrol of coast near Gwa
 Rimau (1942)   – anti-shipping raid by special forces on Japanese shipping in Singapore harbour
 Sabine (1941)   – British and Commonwealth invasion of the Kingdom of Iraq to restore government ousted by Rashid Ali; including;
 Regatta  – 21 Brigade advance from Basra by boat up the Tigris.
 Regulta  – "Euphrates Brigade" (20 Indian Brigade) deployment from Basra to Kut by steamer and barge.
 Sabre (1945)  – cutting of submarine communications cable off Saigon
 Sankey (1945)  – landings by Royal Marines on Cheduba Island
 Screwdriver (1944)  – combined operations raid against a Japanese headquarters at Sitaparokia Rock
 Scupper (1944)  – anti-shipping sweep north of Gwa
 Sheikh Mahmut (1943)  – failed attempt to establish bases in Iraq
 Sleuth (1944)   – pursuit of German commerce raider in Indian Ocean
 Struggle (1945)  – destruction of IJN cruiser Takao in Singapore harbour, using midget submarines
 Talon (1945)   – Anglo-Indian capture of Akyab island and construction of supply airbase in support of Burma campaign
 Lightning (1945)   – landings on Akyab island
 Thursday (1944)  – Chindits operation in Burma
 Transom (1944)       – Allied naval air raid on Surabaya, Java
 Turret (1945)   – Anglo-Indian landings and capture of Taungup
 U-Go (1944)   – Japanese assault on Imphal and Kohima
 Zipper (1945)  Planned British seaborne landing in Malaya.
 Slippery (1945)  deception operation for Zipper
 Broadsword   Planned offensive to northern Malaya following Operation Zipper.
 Mailfist  Planned offensive to liberate southern Malaya and Singapore following Operation Zipper.

Scandinavia and Finland

Axis
 Birke ("Birch") (1944)  – German plan to withdraw from northern Finland prior to the Lapland War.
 Birkhahn (1945)  – German evacuation from Norway.
 Büffel ("Buffalo") (1940)  – German operation to relieve troops in Narvik, Norway.
 Hokki ("Calk") (1944)  – Finnish plan to destroy railroad tracks to deny the Soviets their supplies.
 Holzauge ("Wood knot") (1942)  – activities in Greenland.
 Ikarus (1940)  – planned German invasion of Iceland in response to British Operation Fork.
 Juno (1940)  – German naval operation to disturb allied supplies to Norway.
 Kilpapurjehdus ("Regatta") (1941)  – Finnish naval operation for the militarization of the Åland islands.
 Lachsfang (1942)   – Proposed combined German and Finnish attack against Kandalaksha and Belomorsk.
 Nordlicht ("Aurora Borealis") (1944)  – German withdrawal from the Kola Peninsula into Norway.
 Silberfuchs ("Silver Fox") (1941)   – German and Finnish operations in the Arctic, including:
 Blaufuchs 1 ("Blue Fox 1") (1941)  – Staging of German forces from Germany to northern Finland.
 Blaufuchs 2 ("Blue Fox 2") (1941)  – Staging of German forces from Norway to northern Finland.
 Platinfuchs ("Platinum Fox") (1941)   – Joint German-Finnish attack towards Murmansk from Finnish Petsamo.
 Polarfuchs ("Polar Fox") (1941)   – Joint German-Finnish attack towards Kandalaksha from Finnish Lapland.
 Rentier ("Reindeer") (1941)  – German occupation of Petsamo.
 Sizilien (1943)  – German raid upon allied occupied Spitsbergen (Svalbard).
 Tanne Ost (1944)  – failed German attempt to capture Suursaari from Finland.
 Tanne West (1944)  – planned German attempt to capture Åland from Finland.
 Weserübung ("Weser Exercise") (1940)  – German invasion of Denmark and Norway.
 Weserübung Nord ("Weser Exercise") (1940)  – German invasion of Trondheim and Narvik.
 Weserübung Sud ("Weser Exercise") (1940)  – German invasion of Bergen, Kristiansand and Oslo.
 Zitronella ("Lemon flavour") (1943)  – German raid against a Norwegian/British station on Svalbard.

Allies
 Alphabet  (1940)  evacuation of British troops from Norway
 Archery (1941)  – British commando raid on Vågsøy, Norway
 Anklet (1941)  – raid on German positions on Lofoten Islands, Norway
 Banquet (1940)  – Reallocation of RAF training aircraft
 Carthage (1945)  – RAF bombing of the Gestapo headquarters in Copenhagen, Denmark
 Catherine (1939)  British plan to gain control of Baltic Sea
 Claymore (1941)  – British raid on Lofoten Islands, Norway
 Freshman (1942 ) – attempted raid on a Norwegian heavy water plant at Vemork, see Gunnerside
 Grouse (1942)  – Norwegian guide party for Freshman
 Gunnerside (1943)  – 2nd raid on the Norwegian heavy water plant at Vemork
 Fork (1940)  – Invasion of Iceland by British.
 Gauntlet (1941)    – raid on Spitsbergen
 Ibrox (1945)  – cancelled SAS raid to destroy railway bridge near Trondheim
 Halfback (1945)  – Naval operation that led to the action of 28 January 1945
 Jupiter (1942)  – suggested invasion of Norway
 Musketoon (1942)   – British/ Norwegian destruction of a power station in Norway
 Primrose (1940)  – Planned British landing at Ålesund, Norway
 R 4 (1940)  – Planned British invasion of Norway
 Source (1945)   – British response to German Operation Sizilien
 The Sepals/Perianth Operation (1944) – OSS supported operation in Sweden
 Wilfred (1940)  – British plan to mine the Norwegian coast

Other
 Rädda Danmark ("Save Denmark") (1945)  – Swedish plan to liberate Denmark before the country was occupied by the Soviet Union (cancelled because of German surrender)
 Rädda Själland (1945)  – Swedish landings on Zealand
 Rädda Bornholm (1945)  – Swedish landings on Bornholm

Western Front

Technology

Axis
 Caesar (1945)  – transfer of technical plans and strategic materials to Japan, using .
 Beethoven (1941–1945)  – German programme to develop composite aircraft (Mistel)
 Prüfstand XII ("Test stand") (1945)  – German programme to develop submarine-launched V-2

Allies
 Alsos ("Grove") (1940–1945)   – Allied efforts to gather data on German nuclear fission developments.
 Big (1945) – capture of an atomic pile at Haigerloch.
 Harborage (1945)  – US sweep up of German atomic assets ahead of French occupation.
 Epsilon (1945)  – Eavesdropping on incarcerated German scientists.
 Aphrodite (1944)  The use of B-17 bombers as radio-controlled missiles.
 Backfire (1945)  – launches of captured V-2 rockets.
 Hawkeye (1944)  – Radar research by US Navy.
 Lusty (1945)  – US actions to capture German scientific documents, facilities and aircraft.
 Manhattan Project (1941–1945)  – program to build an atomic bomb.
 Most III ("Bridge III") (1944)   – transfer of captured V-2 components from occupied Poland to Britain. Also known as Wildhorn III.
 Paperclip (1945–)  – capture of scientists, technical and German rocketry. Originally Operation Overcast sometimes called Project Paperclip.
 Surgeon (1945–)  – Similar to Paperclip; program to exploit German aeronautical scientific advances.
 Stella Polaris (1944–)   transfer of Finnish SIGINT, equipment, and personnel to Sweden following end of Continuation war in 1944.
 TICOM ("Target Intelligence Committee") (1945–)  – seizure of intelligence apparatus, in particular cryptographic assets. See also Stella Polaris.

Special Operations Executive

 Operation Jedburgh (1944)   – SOE, OSS, and Free French-Belgian-Dutch exiles parachuted into France, the Netherlands and Belgium to perform guerrilla warfare.

Partisan operations
Includes some operations by regular forces in support of partisans
 Anthropoid (1942)   – assassination of Reinhard Heydrich in Prague.
 Burza ("Tempest") (1944) – a series of local uprisings by the Polish Home Army
 Ostra Brama (1944) – battle for Wilno (Vilnius)
 Canuck (1945)  – SAS operation near Turin to train and organise Italian resistance fighters.
 Carpetbagger (1943)  – US airdrops to several national Resistance forces
 Główki  ("Heads") (1943–1944)  – a series of assassinations of Nazi personnel by the Home Army
 Bürkl (1943)  – assassination of Franz Bürkl
 Hunting (1944)  – assassination of Ludwig Fischer
 Kutschera (1944)  – assassination of Franz Kutschera
 Montagnards (1944)  – FFI action to establish base in Vercors Massif
 Cadillac (1944)  – airborne supply operation to FFI in Vercors Massif
 Eucalyptus (1944)  – airdrop into Vercors Massif of liaison teams
 Zebra (1944)  – airborne supply operation to FFI in Vercors Massif
 Josephine B (1941)  – Free French attack the transformer station at Pessac
 Savannah (1941)  – Free French attempt to ambush and kill Luftwaffe pathfinder pilots in France
 Taśma ("Belt") (1943–1944)  – action of the Home Army against German border guarding stations
 Wieniec ("Garland") (1942) – action of the Polish Związek Odwetu against German railway transport
 Zamość Uprising (1942–1944) – series of operations of the Polish resistance against the Germans

Anti-partisan operations

Intelligence

Axis
 Bernhard (1944) — German plan to damage British economy using forged British banknotes.
 Elster ("Magpie") (1944)  – landings of German agents on the US east coast with objective of gathering intelligence on Manhattan Project
 Haudegen ("Broadsword") (1944)  – German intelligence collection in Spitzbergen, Norway
 Hummer ("Lobster") series (1940 onwards)  – insertion of German agents into Britain. See also Hummer I
 Kadella (1945)  – airdrop of agents near Marseilles
 Plan Kathleen (1941)  – plan sent by the Irish Republican Army (IRA) to Germany seeking support for  activities. Dubbed "Artus" by German Foreign Ministry. See IRA Abwehr World War II for all IRA Abwehr involvement.
 Karneval (1945)  – airdrop of agents near Brussels and Waal
 Mosul (1944)  – air drop of agents and supplies near Mosul
 Pastorius (1942)  – separate landings of German agents on the US east coast with objective of industrial sabotage.
 Perlen-fischer (1945)  – airdrop of agents near Paris
 Salaam (1942)  – insertion of German agents into the British-occupied Kingdom of Egypt
 Seemöwe ("Seagull") series (1940 onwards)  – insertion of German agents into Britain and Ireland. See also Seagull I and Seagull II.
 Taube ("Dove/Pigeon") (1940)  – mission to transport IRA Chief of Staff Seán Russell from Germany back to Ireland.
 Wal ("Whale") (1940)  – aborted German plan to foster links with Scottish and Welsh nationalist groups.
 Walfisch ("Whale") (1940)  – aborted German plan to land an agent in Ireland.

Allies
 Cornflakes (1945)  – insertion of propaganda into the German mail system.
 SIGSALY (1943—1945)  – secure speech system for highest-level Allied communications.
 MAGIC (1939 —)  – SIGINT resulting from Japanese cipher system PURPLE.
 Ruthless (1940)  – Admiralty plan of Ian Fleming to capture an Enigma encryption machine.
 Venona (1940—)   – intelligence sharing resulting from spying on Soviets.
 Ultra  – SIGINT resulting from German cipher system Enigma.
 Cardinal (1945)  – OSS team parachuted into Japanese Manchukuo to rescue Allied POWs including General Wainwright

Uncategorized
 Alpenfestung  – plan for Nazi national Redoubt in Alps.
 Werwolf (1945–50)  – guerrilla force to resist occupation by Allies.
 Big Bang (1947)  – demolition of defences of Heligoland
 Bracelet (1942)  – Churchill's flight to Cairo and Moscow.
 Catapult (1940)  –  Royal Navy actions to seize, disable or destroy the French fleet after France's surrender.
 Downfall (1945)  – Proposed Allied plan for the invasion of Japan.
 Operation Sunrise (1945)     – negotiations leading to German surrender in Italy.
 Eiche ("Oak") (1943)  – German rescue from custody of Benito Mussolini
 Frantic (1943) – The use of Soviet airfields by western Allied bombers.
 Feuerzauber ("Fire Magic") (1936–39) – Transfer of planes, engineers, and pilots to nationalist forces during Spanish Civil War.
 Rügen (1937)  – Bombing of Guernica.
 Bodden (1937–43)  – Abwehr intelligence gathering system operating from Spain and Morocco.
 Ursula (1936–1939)  – Kriegsmarine U-boat operations in support of Francoist and Italian navies.
 Gaff (1944) – attempt to kill Erwin Rommel
 Halyard (1944) – Non-combat Allied airlift behind Axis lines in Yugoslavia
 Jericho (1944) – Allied aircraft bombed Amiens prison in German-occupied France to aid Resistance prison escape
 Keelhaul (1945)   – forced repatriation to the Soviet Union, by the western Allies, of Soviet prisoners of war
 Magic Carpet (1945–1946)  – American  post-war operation to transport US military personnel home
 Manna (1945) – Allied air drops of food to famine-ravaged Netherlands, with German cooperation
 Margarethe (1944)  – German occupation of Hungary.  Döme Sztójay, an avid supporter of the Nazis, become the new Hungarian Prime Minister with the aid of a Nazi military governor.
 Panzerfaust/Eisenfaust ("Armored Fist") (1943)  – Kidnap of Hungarian leader Miklós Horthy's son to prevent defection of Hungary from Axis.
 Peking (1939)  – removal of Polish warships to Britain, in advance of German invasion
 Pied Piper (1939)  – evacuation of children from British cities.
 Rabat (1943)  – Plan to kidnap the Pope and diplomatic corp. from Vatican City.
 Regenbogen ("Rainbow") (1945)  – rescinded order to scuttle Kriegsmarine.
 Rösselsprung ("Knights Move") (1944)  – German attempt to capture Josip Broz Tito
 Safehaven (1944) – allied efforts to capture fleeing Nazis and seize German resources abroad
 Symbol (1943)  – Churchill's flight to Casablanca.
 Tabarin (1943)  – British Antarctic expedition.
 Operation Walküre ("Valkyrie") (194?)  – Plan to deal with general breakdown of civil order within Germany following the death of Hitler and the seizure of power by other Nazi officials or the SS; a cover for clandestine action by the German resistance.
 Worek ("Sack") (1939)  – Polish naval defence of the Polish coast
 Rainbow War Plans (1920s–30s)  – Global US War planning between the World Wars.

Propaganda, war crimes, and genocide
 Operation Himmler (1939)  – A false flag SS and SD operation. Attacks were made against German buildings, near the Polish-German border, to create the appearance of Polish aggression against Germany. This was to then be used as propaganda to justify the German invasion of Poland.
 Reinhard (1943)  – Phase I of the "Final Solution" targeting Jews across Europe.
 Tannenberg (1939)  – plan to exterminate Polish intelligentsia involving Einsatzgruppen.
 Sonderaktion Krakau (1939)  Operation to murder members of the intelligentia at universities in Kraków.
 Generalplan Ost (1942)  plan for ethnic cleansing across Europe. See Also Barbarossa.

References

External links
 WW2DB: List of Axis Operations
 WW2DB: List of Allied Operations
 Operations lists (contains inaccuracies) hier auch erscheinen.

Military operations